Folade Nayo Raincock-Ekunwe (born August 29, 1991) is a Canadian professional basketball player who is currently a free agent.

Career

College
In college, Raincock-Ekunwe attended Simon Fraser University in British Columbia. In her final three years with SFU, she participated in NCAA Division II, where she consistently averaged 18 points a game.

Europe
After college, Raincock-Ekunwe headed to Europe and signed with Pully Basket in the Swiss LNA. She had a successful season taking home several awards. The following year, she travelled north in Europe and signed with Donau-Ries in the German Damen-Basketball-Bundesliga for the 2014–15 season. After one season with the side, she moved to Wasserburg. There she helped lead the team to the German title.

After she concluded her Australian season with Bendigo, Raincock-Ekunwe was signed by Flammes Carolos Basket Ardennes in Charleville-Mézières for the remainder of the 2017 season, playing in just five games. Raincock-Ekunwe will return to France's Ligue Féminine de Basketball for the 2017–18 season, after signing with Rezé-Nantes Basket 44. After the FIBA 2018 World Cup ended, she returned to France to play in the 2018–19 season for Tango Bourges Basket.

Australia
Raincock-Ekunwe signed with the Bendigo Spirit in Australia for the 2016–17 Women's National Basketball League season. The Spirit placed in 6th position for the season and failed to reach the 2017 WNBL Finals. Raincock-Ekunwe was Player of the Week twice and named to the Team of the Week on five occasions.

WNBA
Raincock-Ekunwe was signed by the New York Liberty for the preseason camp, heading into the 2017 WNBA season. She made her preseason debut on May 2, 2017.

National team
Raincock-Ekunwe made her national team debut as a member of the 2011 Development Women's National Team that participated in the 2011 Summer Universiade. In 2013, she moved to the Senior Women's national team and began participating in more exhibition matches. In 2015, Raincock-Ekunwe was a core member of one of the most successful years for the Canadian national team in recent years. She helped bring home their first Pan American Games Gold medal with a win over the USA. She then also participated at the 2015 FIBA Oceania Women's Championship on home soil and helped the team take home the title and secure their place at the 2016 Summer Olympics. In September 2018, she participated at the FIBA World Cup in Tenerife, Spain. Canada ended in 7th place, with Nayo averaging 8.2 points and 6.5 rebounds in 25 minutes on average. In July 2021, she participated in the 2021 Summer Olympics in Tokyo, Japan.

References

External links

1991 births
Living people
Basketball players from Toronto
Basketball players at the 2015 Pan American Games
Basketball players at the 2016 Summer Olympics
Basketball players at the 2020 Summer Olympics
Bendigo Spirit players
Canadian expatriate basketball people in Australia
Canadian expatriate basketball people in France
Canadian expatriate basketball people in Germany
Canadian expatriate basketball people in the United States
Canadian expatriate basketball people in Switzerland
Canadian women's basketball players
College women's basketball players in the United States
Canadian sportspeople of Nigerian descent
Forwards (basketball)
New York Liberty players
Olympic basketball players of Canada
Pan American Games gold medalists for Canada
Pan American Games medalists in basketball
Simon Fraser University alumni
Women's National Basketball League players
Medalists at the 2015 Pan American Games
Black Canadian basketball players